This page lists topics related to Akrotiri and Dhekelia, two British Overseas Territories on the island of Cyprus.



0-9

A
Akrotiri and Dhekelia
Akrotiri (village) — within the Akrotiri sovereign base area.
Ayios Nikolaos Station

B
British Forces Broadcasting Service
British Forces Cyprus
British Overseas Territories

C
Cyprus

D
Dhekelia Cantonment
Dreamer's Bay

E
Episkopi Bay
Episkopi Cantonment

F
Flag of Akrotiri and Dhekelia

G

H

I

J

K

L
LGBT rights in Akrotiri and Dhekelia
Limassol Salt Lake

M
Modern history of Cyprus

N

O
Ormidhia
Outline of Akrotiri and Dhekelia

P

Q

R
RAF Akrotiri

S
Sovereign Base Areas Customs
Sovereign Base Areas Police

T

U
United Kingdom

V

W

X
Xylotymvou

Y

Z

See also

Lists of country-related topics - similar lists for other countries

Index
Indexes of topics by country